December is the fourth solo piano album from George Winston. It was recorded during the fall of 1982 and was released at the end of the year. It is a Christmas album, and more generally a tribute to the winter season. The album is a follow up to Winter into Spring from earlier in 1982.

December is Winston's highest-selling album, having been certified triple Platinum by the RIAA, signifying 3 million copies in shipment. The success of the album, along with several of Winston's other albums from the early 1980s, enabled the record label, Windham Hill, to get international distribution and a higher profile. The album also spent 136 weeks on the Billboard 200, reaching a peak of No. 54 in January 1984, over a year after its original release. In 1987, five years after its release, it reached No. 2 on Billboard's Top Holiday Albums chart.

A 20th Anniversary Edition of the album, with two bonus tracks, was released in 2001. The album was again reissued in 2013 by Valley Entertainment with Dancing Cat Records, Winston's own label. This reissue was packaged in a Digipak and features revised cover art.

Critical reception
AllMusic critic William Ruhlmann commented that December ranks as "the mother of all solo instrumental albums, and with good reason. Mixing traditional carols with Pachelbel's Canon and a few originals, Winston produces a solo piano album of unparalleled—and undeniable—beauty. How can music be simultaneously stirring and soothing, relaxed yet exalted? Millions have found the answer here, and an industry has spent decades trying to duplicate it."

Amazon's editorial staff noted "the album is a classic for a reason—few capture the soft, pensive nature of the season quite like Winston's magnum opus."

Track listing

Personnel
Credits adapted from 1982 vinyl liner notes.
George Winston — piano

Additional
Anne Ackerman, William Ackerman — cover design
Karen Kirsch, Steven Miller — sound engineers
Jack Hunt — mastering
Greg Edmonds — photography

Chart

Certifications

References

1982 albums
George Winston albums
Windham Hill Records albums
Valley Entertainment albums
Christmas albums by American artists